Zubir Said   (22 July 1907 – 16 November 1987) was a Singaporean composer most notable for composing the national anthem of his country, "Majulah Singapura" – "Onward Singapore". 

A self-taught musician, Zubir also worked as a score arranger and songwriter for Cathay Organisation's Keris Film Productions for 12 years, composing numerous songs for the company's Malay Singaporean films. He is believed to have written up to 1,500 songs, with less than 10% of them ever recorded.

Early years

The eldest child in a family of three boys and five girls, Zubir was born on 22 July 1907 in Bukittinggi (formerly known as Fort de Kock) in the Minangkabau highlands of West Sumatra, Indonesia. His mother died when he was seven years old. He attended a Dutch school but had no interest in academic studies. His involvement with music started when he was introduced to the Solfa music system by a teacher. A primary-school classmate subsequently taught him how to make and play a flute, and in middle school, he learned to play the guitar and drums from fellow students and the keroncong group he was involved in.

Move to Singapore
In 1928 at the age of 21, Zubir went to Singapore to make a living as a musician, taking up the suggestion of a sailor friend who had described the island as a place of "glittering lights, seller [coffee with milk] and butter". This was done in the face of objections from his village chieftain father, Mohamad Said bin Sanang, who believed music to be against religion. Zubir's first job was as a musician with City Opera, a bangsawan or Malay opera troupe. He became the troupe's bandleader. Thereafter, in 1936, he joined the recording company His Master's Voice. Zubir went to Java to marry Tarminah Kario Wikromo, a keroncong singer, in 1938; they returned to Zubir's home town of Bukittinggi in 1941 just before the outbreak of World War II. 

Coming back to Singapore in 1947, Zubir worked as a part-time photographer with the Utusan Melayu newspaper while composing and performing music and songs. In 1949 he took up the post of orchestra conductor at Shaw Brothers' Malay Film Production, and in 1952 he joined Cathay-Keris Film Productions as a score arranger and songwriter for the company's Malay films, including Sumpah Pontianak (Blood of Pontianak, 1958) and Chuchu Datuk Merah (Grandchildren of Datuk Merah, 1963). In 1957, he received his first public recognition when his songs were performed at the Victoria Theatre.

"Majulah Singapura"

Singapore, then a British colony, had been conferred city status by a royal charter from King George VI in 1951. In 1958, the City Council of Singapore approached Zubir to compose a song for the city to be titled "Majulah Singapura", which was a motto to be displayed in the Victoria Theatre after its renovation. Zubir's song, "Majulah Singapura" ("Onward Singapore"), was first performed by the Singapore Chamber Ensemble during the grand finale of a concert staged in the Victoria Theatre on 6 September 1958 to celebrate its official reopening. When Singapore attained self-government in 1959, the Government felt that a national anthem was needed to unite the different races in Singapore. 

It decided that the City Council's song, which was already popular, would serve this purpose. After some revisions were made to the song, it was adopted by the Legislative Assembly on 11 November 1959, and on 30 November the Singapore State Arms and Flag and National Anthem Ordinance 1959 was passed. This statute regulated the use and display of the State Arms and State Flag and the performance of the National Anthem. "Majulah Singapura" was presented to the nation on 3 December at the launch of "Loyalty Week", replacing the colonial anthem "God Save the Queen". After Singapore's full independence from Malaysia on 9 August 1965, "Majulah Singapura" was formally adopted as the Republic's national anthem. In a 1984 oral history interview, to sum up his philosophy when composing the anthem, Zubir cited the Malay proverb "" ("You should hold up the sky of the land where you live").

Later years
In 1962, Zubir's songs for the movie Dang Anom won an award at the Ninth Asian Film Festival in Seoul, South Korea. He continued working for Cathay-Keris Film Productions until he retired in 1964, composing numerous songs for Malay films.

He also gave music lessons, and often had other music artists visiting him to talk about music and asking for advice. His third and youngest daughter Puan Sri Dr. Rohana Zubir, a retired lecturer with the University of Malaya, recalled how the family home in Singapore was always filled with music. He was the heart of the conversation, very enthused and willing to share pearls of wisdom so that others could benefit from his work. This generosity extended to other areas of his life. He helped his own family in Sumatra and families in Singapore he had "adopted", sending them medicine and other items with what little he could afford, even though his own family was not well off at the time.

Zubir said he was never driven by money. He believed that money was essential for his survival and to look after the family, and that the money he earned from giving music lessons and his compositions for the film world sufficed. He valued honesty and sincerity in his work and placed importance on purity and originality, whether in his music, lyrics or style of singing. He stopped composing songs for the film company when he was upset about the management's decision to cut production costs by borrowing existing music to be used for dubbing on to the background music of some films.

Zubir died at the age of 80 on 16 November 1987 at Joo Chiat Place in Singapore, survived by four daughters and a son. Despite his legacy, Zubir left only S$20,000 to his name. In 1990, Zubir's life and passion as a musician were documented in a book titled Zubir Said: His Songs, and in 2004 a S$69,000 bronze bust of a bespectacled Zubir was installed in Gallery 6 of the Malay Heritage Centre which pays tribute to icons in Malay arts and culture.

Awards and honours
Zubir receives dozens of awards and honours from in and outside of Singapore for his massive contributions to the Malay world in songs and music and to Singapore. Some of his awards and honours were not in the list below.
 
In recognition of his contributions to the State, Zubir was conferred the Sijil Kemuliaan (Certificate of Honour) on 16 March 1963 and the Bintang Bakti Masyarakat (Public Service Star) in the same year. In 1971, he received the Jasawan Seni (cultural medallion) award from eight Malay cultural organisations, and the Asean Cultural and Communications Award in 1987. He also received a Certificate of Commendation from the Amalgamated Union of Public Employees (AUPE) for composing the AUPE song. In 1995, Zubir was posthumously given a Lifetime Achievement Award by the Composers and Authors Society of Singapore (COMPASS).

On 8 May 2009, the Acting Minister for Information, Communications and the Arts, Lui Tuck Yew, announced that the address of the permanent campus for the School of the Arts (SOTA) near The Cathay will be 1 Zubir Said Drive, in honour of the late composer.

Music
Zubir is primarily remembered for composing Singapore's national anthem, "Majulah Singapura" ("Onward Singapore"). The Malay lyrics exhort Singaporeans to "progress towards happiness together" ("") so that their "noble aspiration[s] bring Singapore success" (""), and to "unite in a new spirit" (""). Here is the full song: "Mari kita rakyat Singapura, Sama-Sama menuju bahagia, Cita-cita kita yang mulia, Berjaya Singapura, Marilah kita bersatu, Dengan semangat yang baru, Semua kita berseru, Majulah Singapura, Majulah Singapura".

In 1956, he also submitted three song compositions to the Malayan – later Malaysian – Government for consideration for their national anthem. However, a different song, "Negaraku", based upon the French songwriter Pierre-Jean de Béranger's "La Rosalie", was selected in the end by its authorities.

Zubir is also remembered for his composition "Semoga Bahagia" ("May You Achieve Happiness") which was aimed at primary-school students, advising them to work hard for their future. It has become a Children's Day song for Singaporean children, and is thus often sung in schools on 1 October. It is also performed during the Singapore Youth Festival.

Zubir is estimated to have written about 1,500 songs, including those written for Cathay-Keris Film Productions' Malay films in the 1950s and 1960s. Less than 10% of these songs were recorded. On 22 August 2007, Zubir's family signed an agreement with Universal Music in Malaysia for the latter to manage his works. The copyright in the songs remains with his family. The idea to do so came after his daughter Dr. Rohana met Sandy Monteiro, senior vice-president (Asean) of the Universal Music Publishing Group in 2005 through Monteiro's wife, who was a good friend of hers. Dr. Rohana was reported as saying: "It is time to hand over the songs in order to revive them two decades after my father's passing. I hope to ensure that his songs continue to live in the hearts of young artists in Malaysia."

Works
 (in Malay).

See also
List of Singaporean patriotic songs

Notes

References

.
.
.
.
.

Further reading

News reports

.
.
.
.
.
.
.
.
 .

Books
 (in Malay).

External links

.
Photograph of Zubir Said at Felix Entertainment
Photograph of Zubir Said at the Peoples' Encyclopedia of Singapore History, Singapore Heritage Society.
Tan, Eleanor; Khoo, Christopher; Ng, Siam Gek (9 August 2020). "The Long-Crooked Road". http://zubirsaid.info/

Singaporean composers
Recipients of the Bintang Bakti Masyarakat
Recipients of the Sijil Kemuliaan
Singaporean people of Malay descent
Singaporean people of Minangkabau descent
Indonesian emigrants to Singapore
Minangkabau people
National anthem writers
1907 births
1987 deaths
People from Bukittinggi